Tatar Encyclopaedic Dictionary (ТЭС) is the first encyclopaedic dictionary published in Tatar language about history of Tatarstan and the Tatar people. The publication is produced by Tatar Encyclopedia Institute of the Republic of Tatarstan Academy of Sciences.

Originally prepared and published in Russian in 1999, Tatar-language version of Tatar Encyclopaedic Dictionary was made available in 2002.

Tatar Encyclopedia Institute further started work on developing multi-volume Tatar Encyclopaedia (in Russian – vol.1 in 2002, vol.2 in 2005, vol.3 in 2006, vol.4 in 2008 & vol.5 in 2010: in Tatar – vol.1 in 2008; vol.2 in 2011; vol.3 in 2012), Tatarstan: Illustrated encyclopedia (in Russian, 2013). The responsible editor for the encyclopedia is Gamirjan S. Sabirjanov.

Tatar Encyclopaedia Institute founding director, TES and Tatar Encyclopedias founding editor-in-chief M. Kh. Khasanovdied in 2010.

References

 Tatar Encyclopaedia (in five volumes). Volume 2: G-J M.H.Hasanov (chief editor)

Tatar language
Tatar encyclopedias
2002 non-fiction books
Russian encyclopedias
21st-century encyclopedias